Lloyd Scott is an American former Negro league second baseman who played in the 1930s.

Scott attended Alcorn State University, and played for the Chicago American Giants and Nashville Elite Giants in 1934. In 19 recorded games, he posted 12 hits and six RBI in 67 plate appearances.

References

External links
 and Seamheads

Year of birth missing
Year of death missing
Place of birth missing
Place of death missing
Chicago American Giants players
Nashville Elite Giants players
Baseball second basemen